Schooner Channel, formerly Schooner Passage, is a strait on the east side of Bramham Island in the Central Coast region of British Columbia, Canada.

Nearby, Allison Harbour was formerly known as False Schooner Passage.

Links

Central Coast of British Columbia
Channels of British Columbia